Interpretations: Celebrating the Music of Earth, Wind and Fire is a tribute album to the R&B band Earth, Wind & Fire produced by Maurice White and released in March of 2007 on Stax Records. The album reached No. 28 on the Billboard Top R&B/Hip-Hop Albums chart.

Overview
The album was the first to be released on the revived Stax Records label.

Singles
Kirk Franklin's cover of "September" reached No. 17 on the Billboard Adult R&B Songs chart and No. 26 on the Hot Gospel Songs chart.

Track listing

Accolades

Dwele's cover of "That's the Way of the World" and Meshell Ndegeocello's rendition of "Fantasy" were both Grammy nominated for Best Urban/Alternative Performance.

References

Earth, Wind & Fire tribute albums
2007 compilation albums
Stax Records compilation albums
Albums produced by Maurice White
Neo soul compilation albums
Rhythm and blues compilation albums